Daffy's Rhapsody is a 2012 3D computer-animated Looney Tunes short film featuring the characters Daffy Duck and Elmer Fudd. Directed by Matthew O'Callaghan and written by Tom Sheppard, the film is an adaptation of the song of the same name which was sung by Mel Blanc and recorded in the 1950s by Capitol Records. It also marked the return of Daffy Duck into his original screwball personality after decades of being miscast as a greedy, self-centered character in most of his post-1940s appearances since the Bugs Bunny short Rabbit Fire (1951). Daffy's Rhapsody was first shown in theaters before Warner Bros.' feature-length film Journey 2: The Mysterious Island. Unlike the previous Looney Tunes 3-D shorts, Daffy's Rhapsody has not yet been released on home media. In 2016, the official Warner Bros. Animation uploaded the short to Google but eventually removed it, leaving unofficial uploads of the short being available.
It took until 2021 for the short to be officially available to purchase on Stars of Space Jam: Looney Tunes Collection.

Plot
Elmer Fudd goes to see an anti-duck hunting musical starring Daffy Duck to which upon seeing Daffy as the star of the show, his hunter instincts kick in and he chases Daffy throughout the short while Daffy (whilst singing to the tune of Hungarian Rhapsody No. 2) is initially unaware of Elmer but soon realizes the danger.

Voice cast
 Mel Blanc (archival recordings) as Daffy Duck.
 Billy West and James Arnold Taylor as Elmer Fudd.

Release

Theatrical
This short was initially scheduled to be released in theaters before Happy Feet Two in 2011, but Warner Bros. decided that I Tawt I Taw a Puddy Tat was more suitable for a film starring penguins.

Home media
On August 14, 2021, Warner Bros released the short digitally on iTunes and Microsoft Movies and TV in Stars of Space Jam: Looney Tunes Collection, making it the first official home video release of the short.

References

External links

 
 Daffy's Rhapsody on YouTube
 

2012 films
2012 3D films
2012 short films
2012 comedy films
2012 computer-animated films
2010s American animated films
2010s children's comedy films
2010s children's animated films
2010s animated short films
2010s musical comedy films
2010s English-language films
2010s Warner Bros. animated short films
American 3D films
Computer-animated short films
American children's animated comedy films
American children's animated musical films
American musical comedy films
Looney Tunes shorts
3D animated short films
Bugs Bunny films
Daffy Duck films
Elmer Fudd films
Tasmanian Devil (Looney Tunes) films
Tweety films
Wile E. Coyote and the Road Runner films
Anthropomorphic animals
Films based on songs
Animated films set in New York (state)
Animated films set in New York City
Films set in a theatre
Films set in the 2010s
Short films directed by Matthew O'Callaghan
Films with screenplays by Matthew O'Callaghan
Films scored by Christopher Lennertz
Warner Bros. Animation animated short films
Reel FX Creative Studios short films